is a railway station in Kashiwazaki, Niigata, Japan, operated by East Japan Railway Company (JR East).

Lines

Station layout
The station consists of two elevated unnumbered opposed side platforms connected by a passage underneath, serving two tracks. The station is unattended.

Platforms

History
Kasahima Station opened on 1 July 1952. With the privatization of Japanese National Railways (JNR) on 1 April 1987, the station came under the control of JR East. A new station building was completed in 2004.

Surrounding area

See also
 List of railway stations in Japan

References

External links

 JR East station information 

Railway stations in Niigata Prefecture
Railway stations in Japan opened in 1952
Shin'etsu Main Line
Stations of East Japan Railway Company
Kashiwazaki, Niigata